Sabina Beganović, also known as Sebina Began is a German actress of Bosnian descent, who resides in Italy. She is an ex-lover of the former Italian Prime Minister Silvio Berlusconi. In an interview with Sky Italia, Began offered one of several explanations for the origin of the controversial term bunga bunga, linked to the sex scandal involving Berlusconi, stating that the term is based on her nickname. In 2015, Began was sentenced to 16 months for recruiting prostitutes to attend parties as Berlusconi's mansions.

Filmography 
Il falco e la colomba (TV series; 2009)
Il caso dell'infedele Klara (2009)
Il mistero del lago (TV movie; 2009)
Crociera Vianello (TV movie; 2008)
Go Go Tales (2007)
Don Matteo (TV series; 2006)
Provaci ancora prof! (TV series; 2005)
Un papà quasi perfetto (TV mini-series; 2003)
Malefemmene (2001)
Aitanic (2000)
Chiavi in mano (1996)

References

External links 

1974 births
German people of Bosnia and Herzegovina descent
German film actresses
German expatriates in Italy
Living people
German television actresses